The  College World Series was the fifth NCAA-sanctioned baseball tournament that determined a national champion.  The tournament was held as the conclusion of the 1951 NCAA baseball season and was played at Johnny Rosenblatt Stadium in Omaha, Nebraska from June 13 to June 17.  The tournament's champion was the Oklahoma Sooners, coached by Jack Baer.  The Most Outstanding Player was Sidney Hatfield of Tennessee.  Oklahoma won national championships in football, wrestling, and baseball in the 1950–51 academic year.

The tournament consisted of no preliminary round of play as teams were selected directly into the College World Series.  From 1954 to the present, teams compete in the NCAA Division I baseball tournament preliminary round(s), to determine the eight teams that will play in the College World Series.

Participants

Results

Bracket

Game results

Notable players
 Ohio State: Moe Savransky, Duke Simpson, Fred Taylor
 Princeton: Dave Sisler
 Southern California: Bob Lillis
 Tennessee: Sidney Hatfield

References

College World Series
College World Series
College World Series
College World Series
Baseball competitions in Omaha, Nebraska
College sports tournaments in Nebraska